Aberdeen F.C. competed in the Scottish Premier Division, Scottish Cup, League Cup and UEFA Cup in season 1981–82.

They finished second in the Scottish Premier Division and won the Scottish Cup for the first time since 1970. In Europe, they reached the third round of the UEFA Cup, their longest run in European competition, after knocking out the holders, Ipswich Town.

Peter Weir became the most expensive player in Scottish football when he was signed from St Mirren for £300,000.

Results

Scottish Premier Division

Final standings

Scottish League Cup

Group stage

Group 3 final table

Knockout stage

Scottish Cup

UEFA Cup

Squad

Appearances & Goals

|}

References

Aberdeen F.C. seasons
Aberdeen